The oocyte maturation inhibitor (OMI) is an inhibitory factor created by follicular cells during a primary oocyte maturation. It is believed to be the reason why the oocyte remains for so long in the immature dictyate state of meiosis.

References 

Embryology